Esporte Clube Boa Vontade, commonly known as Boa Vontade, is a Brazilian men's and women's football club based in São Luís, Maranhão state. The men's team competed once in the Série C and the women's team competed twice in the Copa do Brasil de Futebol Feminino.

History
The club was founded on June 6, 1957.

Men's team
Boa Vontade competed in the Série C in 1995, and won the Torneio da Integração in 2005.

Women's team

The club competed in the Copa do Brasil de Futebol Feminino in 2008, when they were eliminated in the Semifinals by Sport, and in 2009, when they were eliminated in the First Round by Tiradentes.

Achievements

 Torneio da Integração:
 Winners (1): 2005

Stadium

Esporte Clube Boa Vontade play their home games at Estádio Nhozinho Santos. The stadium has a maximum capacity of 16,500 people.

References

Football clubs in Maranhão
Women's football clubs in Brazil
Association football clubs established in 1957
1957 establishments in Brazil